The World Fantasy Awards are given each year by the World Fantasy Convention for the best fantasy fiction and art published in English during the preceding calendar year. The awards have been described by sources such as The Guardian as a "prestigious fantasy prize", and as one of the three most renowned speculative fiction awards, along with the Hugo and Nebula Awards (which cover both fantasy and science fiction). The World Fantasy Special Award—Non-professional is given each year to individuals for their non-professional work in the preceding calendar year in fields related to fantasy that are not covered by other World Fantasy Award categories. These have included editors of magazines and novels, publishers, and authors of non-fiction works. Occasionally some publishing companies have been nominated along with individual editors and publishers. The nomination reasons have sometimes not been specified beyond "contributions to the genre". Individuals are also eligible for the Special Award—Professional category for their professional work. The World Fantasy Special Award—Non-professional has been awarded annually since 1975.

World Fantasy Award nominees and winners are decided by attendees and judges at the annual World Fantasy Convention. A ballot is posted in June for attendees of the current and previous two conferences to determine two of the finalists, and a panel of five judges adds three or more nominees before voting on the overall winner. The panel of judges is typically made up of fantasy authors and is chosen each year by the World Fantasy Awards Administration, which has the power to break ties. The final results are presented at the World Fantasy Convention at the end of October. Through 2015, winners were presented with a statuette of H. P. Lovecraft; more recent winners receive a statuette of a tree.

During the 48 nomination years, 264 individuals and 3 organizations have been nominated; 57 people and 2 organizations have won, including ties and co-nominees. The organizations that have been nominated are: The British Fantasy Society, with one winning nomination; The Friends of Arthur Machen, with one unsuccessful nomination; and Fedogan & Bremer, with one win out of three nominations. Stuart David Schiff has received the most awards at four wins out of six nominations, for his work at Whispers magazine and Whispers Press. R. B. Russell has won four times out of nine nominations, and Rosalie Parker four out of eight, for their work at Tartarus Press. Three other individuals have won twice: Paul C. Allen out of three nominations for Fantasy Newsletter, Richard Chizmar out of seven for Cemetery Dance and Cemetery Dance Publications, and W. Paul Ganley out of ten for Weirdbook and Weirdbook Press. Ganley's ten nominations are the most of anyone, followed by Stephen Jones with nine, winning once, for Fantasy Tales and other work, and Scott H. Andrews with one win out of eight nominations for his work at Beneath Ceaseless Skies.

Winners and nominees
In the following table, the years correspond to the date of the ceremony, rather than when the work was performed. The table includes the stated reason the individual (or company) was nominated, which may not have been the only fantasy-related non-professional work they did during the previous calendar year. "N/A" in the reason column represents a nomination where no reason was given. Entries with a blue background and an asterisk (*) next to the individual's name have won the award; those with a white background are the other nominees on the shortlist.

  *   Winners

Notes

See also
 World Fantasy Convention

References

External links
 World Fantasy Convention official site

Special Non-professional